Ifafa Beach is a small coastal resort town on the south coast of KwaZulu-Natal in South Africa. It is situated on the lagoon of the Fafa River mouth. The river's name is derived from the Zulu word "iFafa" which means (sparkling).

References

Populated places in the Umdoni Local Municipality
Populated coastal places in South Africa
KwaZulu-Natal South Coast